Senator Doyle may refer to:

James Doyle II (born 1972), Rhode Island State Senate
Paul Doyle (politician) (born 1963), Connecticut State Senate
W. F. Doyle (1897–1988), Michigan State Senate
William T. Doyle (born 1926), Vermont State Senate